Albert Samuel Waxman,  (March 2, 1935 – January 18, 2001) was a Canadian actor and director of over 1,000 productions on radio, television, film, and stage. He is best known for his starring roles in the television series King of Kensington (CBC) and Cagney & Lacey (CBS) and Twice in a Lifetime (CTV).

Early life
Waxman was born in Toronto, Ontario to Jewish immigrants from Poland. His parents operated and owned Melinda Lunch, a small restaurant. His father, Aaron Waxman, died when Al was nine.

Career
Waxman's career began at the age of twelve on CBC Radio, but it was not until 1975, when he began playing the role of Larry King on CBC's King of Kensington, that he became a Canadian icon.

In the 1980 award-winning film Atlantic City starring Burt Lancaster, Waxman appeared as a rich cocaine buyer with a seemingly endless amount of cash.

During the 1980s, Waxman starred as the gruff but endearing Lt. Bert Samuels in the highly successful CBS television drama Cagney & Lacey.

During the 1990s, Waxman appeared in a variety of films and television shows, but began spending more time acting and directing in the theatre. In 1991, Al hosted Missing Treasures, a TV show which profiled missing children in Canada. He was also a founding member of the Academy of Canadian Cinema & Television.

In 1997, he was awarded the best actor Gemini Award for his performance in the television film Net Worth.

Waxman also appeared at the Stratford Festival, beginning with his critically acclaimed performance as Willy Loman in Death of a Salesman in 1997. He also directed The Diary of Anne Frank at the Stratford Festival in 2000. He was to return to Stratford for his highly anticipated portrayal of Shylock in The Merchant of Venice in 2001. In the wake of Waxman's death, one month before rehearsals were to begin, Paul Soles accepted the part of Shylock and the play was performed in honour of Waxman.

His last television role was as celestial Judge Othneil in Twice in a Lifetime. The last episode, on which he worked until the afternoon before his elective heart bypass surgery, was about a man, popular in his community, who needed routine bypass surgery, but died during the operation. Although some sections of the episode were rewritten, at the end of this final episode, Waxman's character is asked rhetorically "why do the good die young" to which he has no answer. He's then told "you were quite a warrior". His response – not merely the end of the episode, but one of Waxman's last lines ever recorded, and spoken with a smile – was: "I had my day".

In 1999, he published a memoir That's What I Am which received a Canadian Jewish Book Award.

Community activism
Waxman was involved in community work and charitable causes from coast to coast. He was a spokesperson for organizations such as United Appeal, United Jewish Appeal, Israel Bonds, Variety Club, the Muscular Dystrophy Telethons, and Big Brothers (also becoming an honorary member). From June 1979 to June 1981, he was the National Campaign Chairman for the Canadian Cancer Society, and from 1988 to 1989, he was an official spokesperson for the Heart & Stroke Foundation of Ontario. Together with his wife, Sara Waxman, he also created the Sara and Al Waxman Neo-Natal Unit at the Shaare Zedek Medical Centre in Jerusalem.

Al Waxman was accorded many tributes for his volunteer and philanthropic work. In 1978, he was honoured with the Queen's Silver Jubilee Medal. In 1989, he was the recipient of the B'nai B'rith of Canada Humanitarian Award. In 1996, Waxman was inducted into the Order of Ontario and, in 1997, into the Order of Canada. In 1998, he was given the Earle Grey Award for lifetime achievement in Canadian television.

Death
Waxman died in Toronto during heart surgery on January 18, 2001, at the age of 65. He was buried at Pardes Shalom Cemetery in Maple, Ontario.

Legacy

Memorials
In 2016, Al Waxman was posthumously inducted into Canada's Walk of Fame as a Cineplex Legends Inductee for his enormous contribution to Canadian arts and culture as an actor, director, producer, and consummate and integral supporter of the Canadian film industry and young aspiring artists emerging within it.

Statue
Following his death, a statue of him, created by Ruth Abernethy, was erected in Kensington Market, the Toronto neighbourhood where King of Kensington takes place. The inscription in front of the statue reads "There's lots to do down the road, there's always more. Trust your gut instincts. In small matters trust your mind, but in the important decisions of life – trust your heart."

Fan club
Musician Jaymz Bee started the Al Waxman Fan Club while in high school, and started a punk band with his pals Bazl Salazar, Clay Tyson and Graham Leethat performed only songs about Waxman and his life: "'We ended up with an hour-long show, just about Al Waxman.'" What began as a publicity stunt became a long association between Bee and Waxman. Waxman attended some of the fan club events as organised by Bee, most of which raised money for charities such as the Canadian Cancer Foundation and Big Brother. Bee attended Waxman's funeral and, with his fan club, held a wake in Toronto on January 25, 2001.

Filmography

Movies

1959: Sun In My Eyes
1961: The Hired Gun
1962: The War Lover as Prien: Crew of 'The Body'
1963: The Victors as 'The Squad' Member
1964: Man in the Middle as Cpll. Zimmerman
1967: Do Not Fold, Staple, Spindle or Mutilate
1968: Isabel as Herb
1970: The Last Act of Martin Weston
1971: The Crowd Inside as Director 
1972: When Michael Calls as Sheriff Hap Washbrook
1973: The Sloane Affair as Hogan
1974: Child Under a Leaf as Storekeeper
1974: Sunday in the Country as Sergeant
1974: A Star Is Lost! as Inspector Bruno
1975: My Pleasure Is My Business
1975: The Heatwave Lasted Four Days as Harry
1976: The Clown Murders as Police Sergeant
1979: Wild Horse Hank as Jay Connors
1980: Atlantic City as Alfie
1980: Double Negative as Dellassandro
1981: Heavy Metal as Rudnick (segment "Harry Canyon") (voice)
1981: Tulips as Bert Irving
1982: Class of 1984 as Detective Stewiski
1983:  Spasms as Warren Crowley
1986: Meatballs III: Summer Job as Peter
1988: Switching Channels as Berger
1988: Malarek as Stern
1989: Collision Course as Dingman
1989: Millennium as Dr. Brindle
1989: Mob Story as Sam
1991: Scream of Stone as Stephen
1991: The Hitman as Marco Luganni
1991: White Light
1991: I Still Dream of Jeannie as Gen. Wescott
1992: Quiet Killer as Mayor Andy Carmichael
1992: Live Wire as James Garvey
1992: The Diamond Fleece 
1994: Operation Golden Phoenix as Chief Gordon
1994: Death Junction as Captain Jenkow
1994: Cagney & Lacey: The Return as Lt. Bert Samuels
1995: Iron Eagle on the Attack as Maj. Gen. Brad Kettle
1995: Net Worth as Jack Adams
1996: Gotti as Bruce Cutler
1996: Bogus as School Principal
1996: Holiday Affair as Mr. Corley
1997: The Assignment as Carl Mickens - CIA
1997: Critical Care as Sheldon Hatchett (a Lawyer)
1998: At the End of the Day: The Sue Rodriguez Story as John Hofsess
1999: A Saintly Switch as Coach Beasily
1999: Summer's End as Grandpa Trapnell
1999: The Hurricane as Warden
2000: The Thin Blue Lie as Art Zugler
2001: Life with Judy Garland: Me and My Shadows as Louis B. Mayer (released posthumously)
2001: What Makes a Family as Frank Cataldi (released posthumously)

Television series
1975–1980: King of Kensington as Larry King
1981: Circus International 
1981–1988: Cagney & Lacey as Lt. Bert Samuels
1990–1991: Missing Treasures 
1997: Simply Wine and Cheese
1999–2001: Twice in a Lifetime as Judge Othniel / Judge Jepthah / M.C.

Television appearances
1965: For the People as Berkowitz
1969: Adventures in Rainbow Country 
1979, 1983–1984: The Littlest Hobo as Vic Carrano / Vernie Davis
1979: The Winnings of Frankie Walls as Frankie Walls
1985: Night Heat
1986: Philip Marlowe, Private Eye as Trimmer Waltz
1988: My Secret Identity
1988: Street Legal as Judge John R. Caldwell
1988: Alfred Hitchcock Presents as Dale Linseman
1989: Hard Time on Planet Earth
1989: Murder, She Wrote as Carl Wilson
1993: Sweating Bullets as Brennan
1994-1998: Due South as Nicholas Van Zandt / Vince Leggett
1995-????: Ace Ventura: Pet Detective
1998: Twitch City as Bum
1998–2000: Power Play

References

External links

Northern Stars biography
NOW magazine obituary by Jaymz Bee
Archival collections (1959-1991) and (1967-1991) at Toronto Public Library

1935 births
2001 deaths
Canadian male film actors
Jewish Canadian male actors
Canadian people of Polish-Jewish descent
Canadian male radio actors
Canadian male stage actors
Canadian male television actors
Canadian male voice actors
Canadian television directors
Kensington Market
Members of the Order of Canada
Members of the Order of Ontario
Male actors from Toronto
University of Western Ontario alumni
Film directors from Toronto
Jewish Canadian filmmakers
Best Supporting Actor in a Television Film or Miniseries Canadian Screen Award winners